Kiraitu Murungi (born 1 January 1952) is a Commissioner at the Kenya Law Reform Commission and the former governor of Meru County in Kenya. He is a former long-serving member of parliament for South Imenti constituency (1992-2013), former cabinet minister, and former senator for Meru County.

Education
Kiraitu Murungi was born on 1 January 1952 in Kionyo village, Abogeta division of Meru District in Eastern Kenya to Daniel M’Mwarania and Anjelika Kiajia. He attended Kionyo primary school after which he joined Chuka High School before proceeding to Alliance High School. Murungi graduated with a Bachelor of Law from the University of Nairobi in 1977 and attained a Master of Law in the same university in 1982. In 1991 he attained another Master of Law from Harvard Law School when he was in exile for two years in the United States during Daniel arap Moi's one-party dictatorship period.

Law career
Murungi was a partner in a law firm he founded with Gibson Kamau Kuria and Aaron Ringera, where he practised law for ten years. His biggest case during this period was representing political prisoners of the Moi government including Wanyiri Kihoro against the government itself. A case that is covered in Wanyiri Kihoro's book Never Say Die: The Chronicle of a Political Prisoner and resulted in the detention of Kuria in an attempt to cause the abandonment of the case, as well as a period in exile in various western countries for both Mr. Murungi and Mr. Kuria.

Political career
Upon his return from exile, Kiraitu joined the struggle for multi-party democracy in 1990 as one of Kenya's "Young Turks." Murungi joined the newly formed Forum for the Restoration of Democracy (FORD) following Kenya's return to multi-party politics in 1991. He was elected to parliament on the FORD ticket during the first multi-party election in 1992, serving as Member of parliament for South Imenti Constituency, Meru. Kiraitu decamped from FORD to Democratic Party (DP) when FORD splintered in the aftermath of the demise of its leader, Jaramogi Oginga Odinga, retaining the South Imenti seat during the 1997 general elections. As an opposition member of parliament between 1991 and 2002, Kiraitu served as the shadow Attorney-General and member of the Parliamentary Select Committee on Anti-Corruption.

Murungi has been a member of parliament since 1992 and has formerly served as minister of justice and Constitutional Affairs and as the shadow attorney general. In the 2002 Kenya General Elections he won the South Imenti Constituency MP seat for the National Rainbow Coalition (NARC) party. After the Government's defeat in the 21 November 2005 constitutional referendum, he was appointed Minister of Energy. He was then re-elected as a member of parliament under a Party of National Unity (PNU) ticket in the 2007 elections.

On 8 August 2017, he was elected the governor of Meru County under a Jubilee ticket, defeating the Incumbent Peter Munya and effectively becoming the second governor of the county since its inception. Prior to being the Governor Kiraitu served as the Senator for Meru County after winning the seat under the Alliance Party of Kenya (APK) ticket in the 2013 elections.

Scandals and Controversies
In February 2005, Murungi apologised for making a remark which was criticised as trivialising both rape and corruption. He had said that criticism from aid donors of corruption in Kenya was "like raping a woman who is already willing".

He is one of the closest allies of former Kenyan President Mwai Kibaki. He has been accused of attempting to cover-up in the Anglo Leasing Scandal, which he once claimed that it was a "scandal that never was". On 8 February 2006, the BBC World Service aired a conversation between Murungi and former Governance and Ethics Permanent Secretary John Githongo where he appears to be coercing Githongo to drop his investigations on the Anglo Leasing Scandal. He had promised that Anura Pereira would forgive a debt of KES 30 million owed by Githongo's father.

Murungi initially maintained that he would not resign from his cabinet post despite the allegations of corruption. He claimed that he was innocent and that Githongo's reports are mere propaganda. On the recording, he has commented: "I have listened to the alleged tape recorded evidence. It is truncated, inaudible, insufficient and inadmissible to form any credible proof of the allegations being orchestrated by Mr Githongo". On 13 February 2006, however, President Mwai Kibaki announced that Murungi had resigned to allow full investigation into the allegations. On 14 February 2006, a day after his resignation, Murungi has claimed that he played no role at all to cover-up the Anglo Leasing Scandal. He blamed his woes on the politics of National Rainbow Coalition (NARC) and the media. However, it later emerged that President Mwai Kibaki had asked him to resign from the government.

On 10 February 2006, Murungi issued a statement that was faxed to all Kenyan media houses questioning the intentions and motives of John Githongo, in the form of 36 questions. Among the questions he asked is why John Githongo was recording his conversations with government officials and whether he was a spy for foreign nations.

On 15 November 2006 he was reinstated as Energy Minister by Kibaki. He remained in that Cabinet position appointed by Kibaki until 8 January 2008, following the controversial December 2007 election.

See also
Corruption in Kenya
Chris Murungaru
David Mwiraria

References

External links
 
 Government Curriculum Vitae

Members of the National Assembly (Kenya)
1952 births
Members of the Senate of Kenya
Harvard Law School alumni
Living people
Energy in Kenya
Meru people
20th-century Kenyan lawyers
Government ministers of Kenya
National Rainbow Coalition politicians
Party of National Unity (Kenya) politicians
Alliance Party of Kenya politicians
Alumni of Alliance High School (Kenya)
University of Nairobi alumni
Kenya School of Law alumni